The Principles and Practice of Medicine: Designed for the Use of Practitioners and Students of Medicine is a medical textbook by Sir William Osler. It was first published in 1892 by D. Appleton & Company, while Osler was professor of Medicine at Johns Hopkins University. The book established Osler as the world's leading authority in the teaching of modern medicine.

The text was translated into French, German, Russian, Portuguese, Spanish and Chinese, and for over 40 years it was the world's most significant medical textbook.

First edition
Osler dedicated the book to his teachers; William Arthur Johnson, James Bovell and Robert Palmer Howard. There are 11 sections, preceded by a list of charts and illustrations.

Later years
After 1927, its popularity was succeeded by Cecil Textbook of Medicine.

A revised eleventh edition appeared in 1932.

References

External links
 First edition of the book, digitized for Archive.org by the University of Toronto

Medical manuals
History of medicine
1892 non-fiction books
William Osler